The cyclic redundancy check (CRC) is based on division in the ring of polynomials over the finite field GF(2) (the integers modulo 2), that is, the set of polynomials where each coefficient is either zero or one, and arithmetic operations wrap around.

The coefficients of the remainder polynomial are the bits of the CRC.

Formulation
In general, computation of CRC corresponds to Euclidean division of polynomials over GF(2):

The quotient polynomial  is of no interest. Using modulo operation, it can be stated that

In communication, the sender attaches the  bits of R after the original message bits of M, which could be shown to be equivalent to sending out  (the codeword.) The receiver, knowing  and therefore , separates M from R and repeats the calculation, verifying that the received and computed R are equal.  If they are, then the receiver assumes the received message bits are correct. 

In practice CRC calculations most closely resemble long division in binary, except that the subtractions involved do not borrow from more significant digits, and thus become exclusive or operations.

A CRC is a checksum in a strict mathematical sense, as it can be expressed as the weighted modulo-2 sum of per-bit syndromes, but that word is generally reserved more specifically for sums computed using larger moduli, such as 10, 256, or 65535.

CRCs can also be used as part of error-correcting codes, which allow not only the detection of transmission errors, but the reconstruction of the correct message.  These codes are based on closely related mathematical principles.

Polynomial arithmetic modulo 2
Since the coefficients are constrained to a single bit, any math operation on CRC polynomials must map the coefficients of the result to either zero or one. For example, in addition:

 

Note that  is equivalent to zero in the above equation because addition of coefficients is performed modulo 2: 

 

Polynomial addition modulo 2 is the same as bitwise XOR. Since XOR is the inverse of itself, polynominal subtraction modulo 2 is the same as bitwise XOR too.

Multiplication is similar (a carry-less product):
 

We can also divide polynomials mod 2 and find the quotient and remainder. We would find that
 

In other words, 
 

The division yields a quotient of x2 + 1 with a remainder of −1, which, since it is odd, has a last bit of 1. 

In the above equations,  represents the original message bits 111,  is the generator polynomial, and the remainder  (equivalently) is the CRC.

Variations
There are several standard variations on CRCs, any or all of which may be used with any CRC polynomial.
To check the CRC, instead of calculating the CRC on the message and comparing it to the CRC, a CRC calculation may be run on the entire codeword. If the result (called the residual) is zero, the check passes.

 This simplifies many implementations by avoiding the need to treat the last few bytes of the message specially when checking CRCs.
The shift register may be initialized with ones instead of zeroes. This is equivalent to inverting the first  bits of the message before feeding them into the algorithm. The CRC equation becomes , where  is the length of the message in bits.

When this inversion is done, the CRC does distinguish between such messages.
The CRC may be inverted before being appended to the message stream. While an unmodified CRC distinguishes between messages  with different numbers of trailing zeroes, it does not detect trailing zeroes appended after the CRC remainder itself. (In fact, this is precisely why the first variant described above works.)

In practice, the last two variations are invariably used together.  They change the transmitted CRC, so must be implemented at both the transmitter and the receiver.  While presetting the shift register to ones is straightforward to do at both ends, inverting affects receivers implementing the first variation, because the CRC of a full codeword that already includes a CRC is no longer zero.  Instead, it is a fixed non-zero pattern, the CRC of the inversion pattern of  ones.

The CRC thus may be checked either by the obvious method of computing the CRC on the message, inverting it, and comparing with the CRC in the message stream, or by calculating the CRC on the entire codeword and comparing it with an expected fixed value , called the check polynomial, residue or magic number.

These inversions are extremely common but not universally performed, even in the case of the CRC-32 or CRC-16-CCITT polynomials.

Reversed representations and reciprocal polynomials

Polynomial representations

Example of CCITT 16-bit Polynomial in the forms described (bits inside square brackets are included in the word representation; bits outside are implied 1 bits; vertical bars designate nibble boundaries):

 16 15 14 13 12 11 10  9  8  7  6  5  4  3  2  1  0   coefficient
  1 [0  0  0  1 |0  0  0  0 |0  0  1  0 |0  0  0  1]  Normal                        
    [     1     |     0     |     2     |     1    ]  Nibbles of Normal                 0x1021
 
  0  1  2  3  4  5  6  7  8  9 10 11 12 13 14 15 16
 [1  0  0  0 |0  1  0  0 |0  0  0  0 |1  0  0  0] 1   Reverse                       
 [     8     |     4     |     0     |     8    ]     Nibbles of Reverse                0x8408
 
 16 15 14 13 12 11 10  9  8  7  6  5  4  3  2  1  0
  1 [0  0  0  0 |1  0  0  0 |0  0  0  1 |0  0  0  1]  Reciprocal                    
    [     0     |     8     |     1     |     1    ]  Nibbles of Reciprocal             0x0811
 
  0  1  2  3  4  5  6  7  8  9 10 11 12 13 14 15 16   Reverse reciprocal
 16 15 14 13 12 11 10  9  8  7  6  5  4  3  2  1  0   Koopman
 [1  0  0  0 |1  0  0  0 |0  0  0  1 |0  0  0  0] 1    
 [     8     |     8     |     1     |     0    ]     Nibbles                           0x8810

All the well-known CRC generator polynomials of degree  have two common hexadecimal representations.
The msbit-first representation is a hexadecimal number with  bits, the least significant bit of which is always 1.
The lsbit-first representation is a hexadecimal number with  bits, the most significant bit of which is always 1.

The msbit-first form is often referred to in the literature as the normal representation, while the lsbit-first is called the reversed representation. It is essential to use the correct form when implementing a CRC.  If the coefficient of  happens to be zero, the forms can be distinguished at a glance by seeing which end has the bit set.

To further confuse the matter, the paper by P. Koopman and T. Chakravarty  converts CRC generator polynomials to hexadecimal numbers in yet another way: msbit-first, but including the  coefficient and omitting the  coefficient.  This "Koopman" representation has the advantage that the degree can be determined from the hexadecimal form and the coefficients are easy to read off in left-to-right order.  However, it is not used anywhere else and is not recommended due to the risk of confusion.

Reciprocal polynomials
A reciprocal polynomial is created by assigning the  through  coefficients of one polynomial to the  through  coefficients of a new polynomial.

The most interesting property of reciprocal polynomials, when used in CRCs, is that they have exactly the same error-detecting strength as the polynomials they are reciprocals of.  The reciprocal of a polynomial generates the same codewords, only bit reversed — that is, if all but the first  bits of a codeword under the original polynomial are taken, reversed and used as a new message, the CRC of that message under the reciprocal polynomial equals the reverse of the first  bits of the original codeword.  But the reciprocal polynomial is not the same as the original polynomial, and the CRCs generated using it are not the same (even modulo bit reversal) as those generated by the original polynomial.

Error detection strength
The error-detection ability of a CRC depends on the degree of its key polynomial and on the specific key polynomial used.  The "error polynomial"  is the symmetric difference of the received message codeword and the correct message codeword.  An error will go undetected by a CRC algorithm if and only if the error polynomial is divisible by the CRC polynomial.
Because a CRC is based on division, no polynomial can detect errors consisting of a string of zeroes prepended to the data, or of missing leading zeroes.  However, see Variations.
All single bit errors will be detected by any polynomial with at least two terms with non-zero coefficients.
All two bit errors separated by a distance less than the order of the primitive polynomial which is a factor of the generator polynomial will be detected. As noted above, the  term will not be divisible by the CRC polynomial, which leaves the  term. By definition, the smallest value of  such that a polynomial divides  is the polynomial's order or exponent. The polynomials with the largest order are called primitive polynomials, and for polynomials of degree  with binary coefficients, have order .
This is equivalent to the polynomial having an even number of terms with non-zero coefficients.
All burst errors of length  will be detected by any polynomial of degree  or greater which has a non-zero  term.
(As an aside, there is never reason to use a polynomial with a zero  term. Recall that a CRC is the remainder of the message polynomial times  divided by the CRC polynomial. A polynomial with a zero  term always has  as a factor.

 

 

 

That is, the CRC of any message with the  polynomial is the same as that of the same message with the  polynomial with a zero appended.  It is just a waste of a bit.)

Bitfilters
Analysis technique using bitfilters allows one to very efficiently determine the properties of a given generator polynomial.  The results are the following:

 All burst errors (but one) with length no longer than the generator polynomial can be detected by any generator polynomial . This includes 1-bit errors (burst of length 1). The exception to this result is a bit pattern the same as that of the generator polynomial.
 All uneven bit errors are detected by generator polynomials with even number of terms.
 2-bit errors in a (multiple) distance of the longest bitfilter of even parity to a generator polynomial are not detected; all others are detected. For  this means that blocks of 32,767 bits length do not contain undiscovered 2-bit errors. A list of the corresponding generators with even number of terms can be found in the link mentioned at the beginning of this section.
 All single bit errors within the bitfilter period mentioned above (for even terms in the generator polynomial) can be identified uniquely by their residual. So CRC method can be used to correct single-bit errors as well (within those limits, e.g. 32,767 bits with optimal generator polynomials of degree 16). Since all odd errors leave an odd residual, all even an even residual, 1-bit errors and 2-bit errors can be distinguished. However, like other SECDED techniques, CRCs cannot always distinguish between 1-bit errors and 3-bit errors. When 3 or more bit errors occur in a block, CRC bit error correction will be erroneous itself and produce more errors.

See also
Barrett reduction
Error correcting code
List of checksum algorithms
Parity (telecommunication)
Polynomial representations of cyclic redundancy checks

References

External links 

 — lists CRC polynomials giving best Hamming distances.

Cyclic redundancy checks
Finite fields